Scandium triiodide, also known as scandium iodide, is an inorganic compound with the formula ScI3 and is classified as a lanthanide iodide. This salt is a yellowish powder.  It is used in metal halide lamps together with similar compounds, such as caesium iodide, because of their ability to maximize emission of UV and to prolong bulb life. The maximized UV emission can be tuned to a range that can initiate photopolymerizations. 
 
Scandium triiodide adopts a structure similar to that of iron trichloride (FeCl3), crystallizing into a rhombohedral lattice. Scandium has a coordination number of 6, while iodine has a coordination number of 3 and is trigonal pyramidal.

The purest scandium triiodide is obtained through direct reaction of the elements: 
 2 Sc  +  3 I2   →    2 ScI3
Alternatively, but less effectively, one can produce anhydrous scandium triiodide by dehydrating ScI3(H2O)6.

Further information
Tomasz Mioduski, Cezary Gumiski, and Dewen Zeng "Rare Earth Metal Iodides and Bromides in Water and Aqueous Systems. Part 1. Iodides" Journal of Physical and Chemical Reference Data 2012, vol. 41, 013104-1 to  013104-63.

References

Scandium compounds
Iodides
Metal halides